Kindo is an American rock band.

Kindo may also refer to:

 Michael Kindo (1947–2020), an Indian former field hockey player
 Kindo Didaye or Kindo Koysha, districts of Southern Nations, Nationalities, and Peoples' Region in Ethiopia
 Kindo Baha, a vihara in Nepal